Alexander Dalrymple Orr (November 6, 1761 – June 21, 1835) was an American farmer and politician from Maysville, Kentucky.

Orr was born in Alexandria, Virginia and in 1782 moved to Bourbon County, KY, which then remained a part of Virginia. He served in the Virginia House of Delegates beginning in 1790, and the Virginia Senate beginning in 1792. After statehood, he represented Kentucky in the United States House of Representatives from November 8, 1792, to March 3, 1797. Orr died in Paris, Kentucky.

References

External links
 
 

1761 births
1835 deaths
Members of the Virginia House of Delegates
Virginia state senators
Democratic-Republican Party members of the United States House of Representatives from Kentucky
People from Bourbon County, Kentucky
Politicians from Alexandria, Virginia
18th-century American politicians
Farmers from Kentucky